Group B of the 2018 FIBA Women's Basketball World Cup took place from 22 to 25 September 2018. The group consisted of Argentina, Australia, Nigeria and Turkey.

The top team advanced to the quarterfinals while the second and third placed team played in a qualification round.

Teams

Standings

Matches

Australia vs Nigeria

Turkey vs Argentina

Argentina vs Australia

Nigeria vs Turkey

Australia vs Turkey

Argentina vs Nigeria

References

2018 FIBA Women's Basketball World Cup